Church's Texas Chicken is an American fast food restaurant chain that specializes in fried chicken and is headquartered in Atlanta, Georgia. The chain was founded as Church's Fried Chicken To-Go by George W. Church Sr. on April 17, 1952, in San Antonio, Texas, across the street from The Alamo. Church's Texas Chicken trades as Texas Chicken or Church's Chicken in many countries.  The chain is currently owned by American private equity firm High Bluff Capital Partners.
As of 2017, Church's Texas Chicken had more than 1,700 franchised and company-owned locations in 26 countries.

History

In 1952, retired chicken incubator salesman George W. Church Sr. opened the first Church's Chicken, named Church's Fried Chicken To-Go, in San Antonio, Texas.

Initially, Church's Chicken was a single walk-up establishment that only sold fried chicken, and two pieces of chicken and a roll cost 49 cents. Church's Chicken added fries and jalapeños to its menu in 1955. To allow customers to see their food prepared while they waited, Church Sr. designed the kitchen with the fryers next to the takeout window.

Early expansion, franchising and sale
The company had four restaurants by the time of Church Sr.'s death in 1956. After his death, family members took over operations, and in 1962, with Church Sr.'s son Bill Church Jr. as top executive, there were eight restaurants in San Antonio. To begin expanding and franchising in 1965, Church Jr. and his brother Richard developed a signature marinade that could be prepared at any location. Former vacuum cleaner salesman J. David Bamberger, who first met Church Jr. when he joined Bamberger's vacuum cleaner distributorship, joined Church's Chicken in 1965 to oversee the franchising. By 1967, the chain opened restaurants in five Texan cities outside of San Antonio and operated 17 restaurants in 1968.

In 1966, a contract between Church's Fried Chicken, Inc. and Jim Dandy Fast Foods, Inc. gave Jim Dandy the right to use the trade names and trademarks "Church's Fried Chicken" or "Church's" within fifty miles Houston's city hall and within the city limits of Galveston, Texas for ten years, as long as Church's Chicken received the agreed upon royalties.

In 1968, the Church family sold the company, which became incorporated and went public in 1969. By the end of that year, there were more than 100 Church's Chicken restaurants in seven states, making the chain the first from Texas to become a national one. Church's Chicken gained 387 more restaurants between 1969 and 1974.

In the late 1970s, the chain briefly operated a hamburger franchise in Texas called G.W. Jrs. The roughly 60 locations were shuttered in 1985.

In 1980, Church Jr. resigned as corporation chairman and was replaced by childhood friend Roger Harvin.

Hala Moddelmog was appointed president of Church's Chicken in March 1996, making her the first female president of a fast food restaurant chain.

Global and national expansion

Church's Chicken began its international expansion in the 1970s and the locations were in Canada, Mexico, Japan, and Puerto Rico. It also gained  popularity in the 1980s when it was first opened in Indonesia under a trade name "Texas Chicken". The first reason of changing the name into "Texas" is because the brand name "Church" does not seem to be popular for countries with majority non-Christian religions such as Indonesia. Afterwards, locations in Malaysia, Taiwan, Singapore, and the Philippines were also opened under the trade name "Texas Chicken".

In February 2008, Church's Chicken entered the UK market under the "Texas Chicken" name, claiming to have signed up 50 former Dixy Chicken franchisees. However, only a small number of restaurants opened, with one in High Road Leytonstone, London, and another in Salford, Greater Manchester. They withdrew from the country a few years later, and the former Texas Chicken location in Leytonstone was replaced with a new independent fried chicken restaurant known as Tex Bites. (Church's in the UK is also the name of an unrelated shoe store chain.)

In 2017, Church's Chicken announced a multi-year development deal with Goalz Restaurant Group, LLC to develop 20 Church's Chicken restaurants each year in Florida, Kentucky, Ohio, Colorado, North Carolina and South Carolina.

As of 2022, Church's Texas Chicken operates more than 1,500 locations worldwide. Its international locations include  Bahrain, Belarus, Cambodia, Canada, Curaçao, Guyana, Honduras, Indonesia, Iraq, Jordan, Vientiane (Laos), Malaysia, Mexico, New Zealand, Oman, Pakistan, Puerto Rico, Saudi Arabia, Qatar, Singapore, St. Lucia, Thailand, Trinidad & Tobago, United Arab Emirates and Vietnam.

Acquisitions
After a four-month legal dispute to avoid a takeover, Church's Chicken became the second-largest chicken restaurant chain when it was acquired by Popeyes for $330 million in 1989. The acquisition court documents stated that Church's Chicken would close 250 of its restaurants, "keep 92 with the Church's name, rename 303 others as Popeyes and sell 440 others for about $160 million over the next four years". Merrill Lynch and a group of banks led by Canadian Imperial financed the acquisition, and in 1992, Popeyes' parent company, Al Copeland Enterprises, Inc., was forced to file chapter 11 bankruptcy for the more than $400 million debt it owed its creditors for the Church's Chicken buyout. In 1993, Al Copeland Enterprises, Inc. was renamed AFC Enterprises, Inc., or America's Favorite Chicken, and became the parent company of Church's Chicken and Popeyes.

In 2004, Arcapita bought Church's Chicken from AFC Enterprises, Inc., and former Domino's Pizza and Little Caesars executive Harsha Agadi became president and CEO of Church's Chicken. Because Arcapita invests in companies that respect Shari'ah principles, it removed pork products from the Church's Chicken menu in 2005.

In 2007, AFC Enterprises, Inc. filed a lawsuit against Church's Chicken and former franchise group CVI Company for allegedly colluding to breach Popeyes' franchise, development and guaranty agreements with CVI when "Church's [Chicken] bought all 10 of CVI's Popeyes' restaurants and converted most of them to the Church's Chicken brand".

On August 10, 2009, San Francisco private equity firm Friedman Fleischer & Lowe bought Church's Chicken from Arcapita at an estimated value of $390 million, according to Financial Times. In June 2019, it was reported that Friedman Fleischer & Lowe placed the company up for sale after years of declining sales and store counts.

On August 2, 2021, Church's Chicken announced that it would be acquired by High Bluff-backed Rego Restaurant Group, the owners of Quiznos and Taco del Mar. The acquisition is expected to be completed in the third quarter.

Co-franchising
By the mid-to late-1990s, Church's Chicken and hamburger chain White Castle announced their co-franchise, in which both companies would sell their own separate products while operating in some shared restaurant spaces with some shared personnel. In Canada, Church's Chicken items were once available in Harvey's restaurants, but the co-venture was discontinued.

Oklahoma restaurant closures
In 2015, the Oklahoma Tax Commission shuttered 15 Church's Chicken restaurants owned by the Reciprocity Restaurant Group LLC  for not paying more than $400,000 in sales taxes to the state of Oklahoma.

Data breach
In 2019, Church's Chicken launched an investigation into a data breach of their payment processing systems. At least 160 company-owned restaurants in 11 states were impacted.

COVID-19 pandemic
In response to the COVID-19 pandemic, most Church's Chicken restaurants closed their dining rooms and continued their drive-thru, counter, takeout and delivery services.

Company executives announced a franchisee relief plan where Church's Chicken franchisees could defer 50% of their royalties and ad fund contributions for the next four weeks, beginning March 30, 2020.

Products

Church's Texas Chicken offers chicken combos, family meals and tenders. The combos and family meals include a choice of one or more sides, including fried okra, coleslaw, mashed potatoes, corn on the cob, honey butter biscuits and jalapeño peppers. The dessert menu includes the Texas sheet cake cup and apple pie.

The seasonal seafood menu includes shrimp and crispy fish.

Church's Texas Chicken restaurants have stocked beverages supplied by The Coca-Cola Company since 1952. In 2008, the companies announced the renewal of their existing contract.

In 2021, Church's Chicken announced Performance Food Group Company as its exclusive distributor in the United States through 2026.

Sponsorship and philanthropy
From 1979 through 1986, Church's Chicken sponsored the ChessCafe Grand Prix tournaments under the auspices of the United States Chess Federation.

Church's Partners Foundation, Inc. is a 501(c)(3) charity that supports the employees of franchisees of Church's Chicken, their families and their communities. The foundation awards $1,000 scholarships to American high school students through their Church's Scholars Program and announced that over $227,000 worth of scholarships would be awarded during the 2018–2019 academic year.

Church's Chicken has partnered with No Kid Hungry since 2016.

See also
 List of fast-food chicken restaurants

References

External links

 
 

Restaurants in San Antonio
Fast-food chains of the United States
Fast-food poultry restaurants
Chicken chains of the United States
Companies based in Sandy Springs, Georgia
Restaurants established in 1952
1952 establishments in Texas
American companies established in 1952
2004 mergers and acquisitions
2009 mergers and acquisitions
Private equity portfolio companies
Fried chicken
Companies that filed for Chapter 11 bankruptcy in 1991